Showtime or Show Time may refer to:

Film
 Showtime (film), a 2002 American action/comedy film
 Showtime (video), a 1995 live concert video by Blur

Television

Networks and channels
 Showtime Networks, a division of Paramount Global which owns the Showtime brand
 Showtime (TV network), a cable and satellite TV network headquartered in the U.S., part of the Paramount Global division called "Showtime Networks"
 Showtime Arabia, former dominant TV service in the Middle East and North Africa, has since been merged into a pay-TV network called "OSN"
 Showtime Movie Channels, a suite of Australian premium networks owned under a studio consortium which licenses the Showtime name
 Showtime Scandinavia, a television channel broadcasting action movies to the Nordic countries

Series and programs
 Showtime (Australian TV series), a 1959–1960 variety show
 Showtime (Croatian TV series), a 2007 talent show similar to Pop Idol
 Showtime (South Korean TV series), a reality television series since 2013
 It's Showtime (Philippine TV program), previously Showtime, a Philippine noontime variety show
 NBA Showtime, a pregame show aired before each NBA on NBC telecast

Episodes
 "Showtime" (Buffy the Vampire Slayer)
 "Showtime" (Law & Order)
 "Showtime" (M*A*S*H)

Music

Albums
 Showtime (Angel & Khriz album) (2008)
 Showtime (Bro'Sis album) (2004)
 Showtime (James Brown album) (1964)
 Show Time (Arnett Cobb album) (1987)
 Show Time (Ry Cooder album) (1977)
 Show Time (Doris Day album) (1960)
 Showtime (Dizzee Rascal album) (2004)
 Showtime (The J. Geils Band album) (1982)
 Showtime (Nitzer Ebb album) (1990)
 Showtime (Mick Ronson album) (1999)
 Show Time (Show Lo album) (2003)
 Show Time (Slave album)
 Showtime, by TV-2 (2011)

Songs
"Show Time", by The Detroit Emeralds (1968)
"Showtime", by Nelly Furtado from Loose (2006)
"Showtime", by Lower Than Atlantis from Changing Tune (2012)
"Showtime", by MC Ren from Renincarnated (2009)

Sports
Showtime (basketball), a style of basketball associated with the Los Angeles Lakers from 1979 to 1991
Showtime All-Star Wrestling, an American professional wrestling promotion based in Nashville, Tennessee
Eric Young (wrestler) (born 1979), nickname for Canadian professional wrestler
Shohei Ohtani (born 1994), nickname for Japanese professional baseball player

Other uses
Showtime (busking), a dance style for buskers in the New York City Subway
 "Showtime" Marching Band, a marching band from Howard University in Washington, DC
 The Sims 3: Showtime, the sixth expansion pack for The Sims 3
 Showtime Rotisserie, a small oven invented and advertised by Ron Popeil
 Showtime, a fragrance endorsed by Kylie Minogue

See also

It's Showtime (disambiguation)
ShoTime (disambiguation)